The 2023 Copa do Brasil third round will be the third round of the 2023 Copa do Brasil football competition. It will be played from 12 to 26 April 2023. A total of 32 teams will compete in the third round to decide 16 places in the final rounds of the 2023 Copa do Brasil.

Draw
The draw for the third round will be held on 27 March 2023 at CBF headquarters in Rio de Janeiro. In a first draw, the 32 teams, seeded by their CBF ranking, will be drawn into 16 ties. The home and away teams of each leg will be decided in a second draw. CBF ranking is shown in parentheses.

Format
In the third round, each tie will be played on a home-and-away two-legged basis. If the aggregate score is level, the second-leg match will go straight to the penalty shoot-out to determine the winners.

Matches
All times are Brasília time, BRT (UTC−3)

|}

Match 61

Winners advance to the round of 16.

Match 62

Winners advance to the round of 16.

Match 63

Winners advance to the round of 16.

Match 64

Winners advance to the round of 16.

Match 65

Winners advance to the round of 16.

Match 66

Winners advance to the round of 16.

Match 67

Winners advance to the round of 16.

Match 68

Winners advance to the round of 16.

Match 69

Winners advance to the round of 16.

Match 70

Winners advance to the round of 16.

Match 71

Winners advance to the round of 16.

Match 72

Winners advance to the round of 16.

Match 73

Winners advance to the round of 16.

Match 74

Winners advance to the round of 16.

Match 75

Winners advance to the round of 16.

Match 76

Winners advance to the round of 16.

References

2023 in Brazilian football